The Royal Society Armourers and Brasiers' Company Prize is sponsored by the Worshipful Company of Armourers and Brasiers and awarded biennially by the Royal Society "for excellence in materials science and technology" and is accompanied by a £2000 gift. The medal was first awarded in 1985 to Michael F. Ashby "in recognition of his outstanding contributions to materials science, first for identifying the mechanism underlying and by modelling theoretically a number of phenomena of great importance to the materials engineer".

Laureates 
Laureates of the award include:

References 

Royal Society